SET binding protein 1 is a protein that in humans is encoded by the SETBP1 gene.

Gene 

The gene is located on Chromosome 18, specifically on the long (q) arm of the chromosome at position 12.3. This is also written as 18q12.3.

Function 

The SETBP1 gene provides instructions for making a protein known as the SET binding protein 1, which is widely distributed throughout somatic cells. The protein is known to bind to another protein called SET. SETBP1 is a DNA-binding protein that forms part of a group of proteins that act together on histone methylation to make chromatin more accessible and regulate gene expression. There is still more to learn about the overall function of the SETBP1 protein 
and the effect of SET binding.

Clinical significance 

Gain-of-function mutations in the SETBP1 gene are associated with Schinzel–Giedion syndrome.

Loss-of-function mutations in the SETBP1 gene are associated with a SETBP1-related developmental delay called SETBP1 disorder which causes a spectrum of symptoms including absent speech/expressive language delays, mild-severe intellectual disability, autistic-traits/autism, developmental delays, ADHD, and seizures. 

SETBP1 is an oncogene; specific somatic mutations of this gene were discovered in patients affected by atypical Chronic Myeloid Leukemia (aCML) and related diseases. These mutations, which are identical to the ones present in SGS as germ line mutations, impair the degradation of SETBP1 and therefore cause increased cellular levels of the protein.

References

Further reading

External links 
  OMIM entry on Schinzel-Giedion Midface Retraction Syndrome

 SETBP1 Society - Non-profit providing support to individuals with SETBP1 disorder and their families, to promote discussion and fund research, and to bring awareness and education to the public.